is a Japanese professional footballer who plays as a midfielder.

Club career

Vissel Kobe
In 2013 Tomoki Wada joined Vissel Kobe on a two-year deal, Wada only played one Japanese League Cup game for Vissel Kobe and then got loaned out to J.League U22 Selection and played twelve matches and scored two goals.

Incheon United FC
In 2015 Tomoki Wada signed a one-year deal with Incheon United, where he managed to play twenty-two matches and scored two goals throughout his time at the club.

Gwangju FC
In 2016 Tomoki Wada signed for Gwangju on a one-year deal, Wada only played twenty-eight games for the club.

Seoul E-Land
In 2017 Tomoki Wada signed a three-year deal with Korean second-division side Seoul E-Land and managed to play thirty-five matches and scored eight goals whilst his three years with the club.

Rockdale Ilinden FC
In 2020 Tomoki Wada decided to leave South Korea and move to Australia with dreams of playing in the Australian A-League Wada put pen to paper with semi-professional side Rockdale Ilinden on a three-year deal where Wada proved his talent to the Australian New South Wales Premier League and played in fifty-two matches for Rockdale and scored fourteen goals. Wada helped Rockdale gain a final place in the Australian New South Wales Premier League final where they became runners-up.

Persikabo 1973
After a successful three-year spell with Rockdale Ilinden In 2022, Wada wanted to leave back to Asia and play football, he signed a two-year deal with Persikabo 1973 and played twelve matches and scored two goals. Wada at the halfway point of the season terminated his contract with Persikabo 1973 and now is without a club as of the new year.

Honours
Vissel Kobe
 J2 League: 2013

Incheon United
 K League 1: 2015

Rockdale Ilinden
 New South Wales Premier League: 2020
 Footballer of the Year: 2020, 2021

References

External links
 
 

1994 births
Living people
Association football people from Hyōgo Prefecture
Japanese footballers
Association football midfielders
J1 League players
J2 League players
J3 League players
K League 1 players
K League 2 players
National Premier Leagues players
Liga 1 (Indonesia) players
Vissel Kobe players
J.League U-22 Selection players
Incheon United FC players
Gwangju FC players
Seoul E-Land FC players
Rockdale Ilinden FC players
Persikabo 1973 players
Japanese expatriate footballers
Japanese expatriate sportspeople in South Korea
Expatriate footballers in South Korea
Expatriate soccer players in Australia
Japanese expatriate sportspeople in Australia
Expatriate footballers in Indonesia
Japanese expatriate sportspeople in Indonesia